Napecoetes belogramma is a moth in the Psychidae family. It was described by Turner in 1916. It is found in Australia, where it has been recorded from Queensland.

The wingspan is about 12 mm. The forewings are ochreous-whitish, with patchy fuscous irroration. The hindwings are grey.

References

Natural History Museum Lepidoptera generic names catalog

Psychidae
Moths described in 1916